Nolde may refer to:

People
 Emil Nolde, German Danish painter
 Frederick Nolde, American human rights pioneer
 Jacob Nolde, American industrialist and environmentalist
 William Nolde, American military officer

Places
 Nolde, Denmark, a village in the Aabenraa Municipality
 Nolde, Netherlands, a hamlet in Drenthe province

Other
 5698 Nolde, asteroid